The Republic of Poland Ambassador to Norway (formally the Ambassador of the Republic of Poland to the Kingdom of Norway) is the official representative of the President and the Government of Poland to the King and Government of Norway. Until 2013 Poland Ambassador to Norway was accredited to Iceland.

Diplomatic relations between Poland and Norway were established in 1919. Embassy of Poland in Norway is located in Oslo's borough of Frogner.

List of ambassadors of Poland to Norway

Second Polish Republic 

 1919-1921: Czesław Pruszyński (envoy)
 1921-1924: Henryk Sokolnicki (chargé d'affaires)
 1924-1927: Michał Kwapiszewski (chargé d'affaires)
 1927-1931: Leszek Malczewski (envoy)
 1931-1942: Władysław Neuman (envoy)
 1942-1945: Władysław Günther-Schwarzburg (envoy)

People's Polish Republic 

 1946-1948: Mieczysław Rogalski (envoy)
 1948-1954: Józef Giebułtowicz (envoy)
 1957-1959: Albert Morski (envoy)
 1959-1961: Halina Kowalska (chargé d'affaires)
 1961-1963: Kaziemierz Dorosz (envoy)
 1963-1967: Wiktor Jabczyński (chargé d'affaires)
 1967-1969: Mieczysław Łobodycz 
 1969-1973: Przemysław Ogrodziński
 1973-1974: Czesław Godek (chargé d'affaires)
 1974-1975: Tadeusz Wianecki (chargé d'affaires)
 1975-1978: Romuald Poleszczuk
 1978-1979: Jerzy Roszak
 1979: Henryk Wendrowski
 1979-1982: Henryk Jęsiak
 1981-1985: Karol Nowakowski
 1985-1988: Franciszek Stachowiak

Third Polish Republic 

 1988-1992: Karol Nowakowski
 1991-1996: Lech Sokół
 1996-2001: Stanisław Czartoryski
 2001-2005: Andrzej Jaroszyński
 2005-2007: Ryszard Czarny
 2007:Włodzimierz Anioł (chargé d’affaires)
 2007-2012: Wojciech Kolańczyk
 2012-2016: Stefan Czmur
 2016-2018: Marian Siemakowicz (chargé d’affaires)
 since 2018: Iwona Woicka-Żuławska

See also 

 Embassy of Poland, Oslo

References 

Norway
Poland